Sunset Eyes 2000 is an album by trumpeter Saskia Laroo and saxophonist Teddy Edwards which was recorded in 1999 and released on the Laroo label.

Reception

In his review on Allmusic, Alex Henderson states "Sunset Eyes 2000 falls short of being a gem, but it's a satisfying, decent effort that bop fans will enjoy".

Track listing 
All compositions by Teddy Edwards except where noted
 "Nothin' But the Truth" – 6:01
 "Moving In" – 5:04
 "There Is No Greater Love" (Isham Jones, Marty Symes) – 6:12
 "Sunset Eyes" – 5:30
 "Cheek to Cheek" (Irving Berlin) – 6:56
 "Don't Touch Me" – 5:38
 "The Blue Sombrero" – 4:56
 "I Got It Bad' (Duke Ellington, Paul Francis Webster) – 3:43
 "Wheelin' and Dealin'" – 4:24
 "Blue Bossa" (Kenny Dorham) – 7:35
 "Sunset Eyes Latin" – 4:40

Personnel 
Saskia Laroo – trumpet (tracks 1–7 & 9–11)
Teddy Edwards – tenor saxophone (tracks 1, 2 & 4–11)
Ernie Andrews – vocals (tracks 4, 6 & 11)
Art Hillery – piano
Wendell Williams – bass
Gerryck King – drums

References 

Teddy Edwards albums
Saskia Laroo albums
1999 albums